A514 may refer to :
 A514 road (Great Britain)
 A514 steel
 Werra (A514), a 1993 Elbe class replenishment ship built in the Flensburger Schiffbau-Gesellschaft